David Robert Plunket, 1st Baron Rathmore PC, QC (3 December 1838 – 22 August 1919) was an Irish lawyer and Conservative politician.

Background and education
Plunket was the third son of John Plunket, 3rd Baron Plunket, second son of William Plunket, 1st Baron Plunket, Lord Chancellor of Ireland. His mother was Charlotte, daughter of Charles Kendal Bushe, Lord Chief Justice of Ireland, while the Most Reverend William Plunket, 4th Baron Plunket, Archbishop of Dublin, was his elder brother. He was educated at Trinity College Dublin and was called to the Irish Bar in 1862.

Political and legal career
After practising on the Munster Circuit for a number of years, Plunket was made a Queen's Counsel in 1868, and became Law Adviser to the Lord Lieutenant of Ireland that same year. In 1870, he was elected Conservative Member of Parliament for Dublin University, and was Solicitor General for Ireland under Benjamin Disraeli from 1875 to 1877. He was then briefly Paymaster General under Disraeli (then known as the Earl of Beaconsfield) in 1880 and was sworn of the Privy Council the same year. In 1885 he became First Commissioner of Works in Lord Salisbury's first ministry, a post he held until January 1886. He resumed the same post in August of the same year when the Conservatives returned to power, and held it until 1892. On his retirement from the House of Commons in 1895 he was elevated to the peerage as Baron Rathmore, of Shanganagh in the County of Dublin.

Apart from his political and legal career he was a director of the Suez Canal Company, Chairman of the North London Railway for many years and a director of the Central London Railway at its opening in 1900..

Personal life

In Dublin, Rathmore was a member of the Kildare Street Club. He died in August 1919, unmarried, at the age of eighty, in the Railway Hotel in Greenore, County Louth and is buried at Putney Vale Cemetery in London. His peerage became extinct at his death.

References

External links

1838 births
1919 deaths
Alumni of Trinity College Dublin
Barons in the Peerage of the United Kingdom
Irish barristers
Irish Conservative Party MPs
Members of the Privy Council of the United Kingdom
Plunket, David Robert
Solicitors-General for Ireland
Plunket, David Robert
Plunket, David Robert
Plunket, David Robert
Plunket, David Robert
Plunket, David Robert
Plunket, David Robert
UK MPs who were granted peerages
Younger sons of barons
Directors of the London and North Western Railway
Irish Queen's Counsel
Peers of the United Kingdom created by Queen Victoria